Detective School (a.k.a. Detective School – One Flight Up) is an American television sitcom that was shown on ABC for four months in 1979, for a total of 13 episodes.

The show was about an assortment of students who went to night school to learn basic detective skills, but who kept being caught up in real criminal cases and getting themselves and their teacher (an inept private investigator) into trouble.

This show was written, directed and produced by Jeff Harris and Bernie Kukoff, the creators of Diff'rent Strokes.

Cast and characters
 James Gregory as Nick Hannigan, the inept P.I. who teaches the class.
 Douglas Fowley as Robert Redford, an elderly student who just happens to have the same name as the actor.
 Randolph Mantooth as salesman Eddie Dawkins.
 Melinda Naud as lingerie model Maggie Ferguson.
 Taylor Negron as disco-dancing Silvio Galindez.
 LaWanda Page as loudmouthed housewife Charlene Jenkins.
 Pat Proft as door-to-door salesman Leo Frick.

Episodes

Season 1: summer 1979

Season 2: autumn 1979

References

External links
 

1970s American sitcoms
1979 American television series debuts
1979 American television series endings
American Broadcasting Company original programming
English-language television shows
Fictional amateur detectives
Television shows set in New York City